Jozef Mihál MP (born 18 March 1965) is a Slovak politician and tax consultant.  He was Deputy Prime Minister; Minister for Labour, Social Affairs, and Family; and deputy leader of Freedom and Solidarity (SaS).

Mihál attended Charles University in Prague, graduating in mathematics and physics in 1988.  He worked for Aurus.  From 2005 to 2006, he served as an advisor to the government on reform of health insurance.  From 2007, he has owned his own company, Relia, which provides consultancy and training on tax.

He ran for the National Council with Freedom and Solidarity in the 2010 election.  SaS came third, with 22 seats, while Mihál personally received the third-most votes amongst SaS candidates: easily winning election.  The party formed a four-party centre-right coalition, and Mihál was appointed to the government as Freedom and Solidarity's Deputy Prime Minister and as Minister of Labour, Social Affairs and Family.

As minister, Mihál has worked with Ivan Mikloš and Ivan Uhliarik to eliminate tax loopholes.  He has championed reforming the social security system with the 'levy bonus', along the lines of the 'universal benefit' being adopted by the Conservative-led government in the United Kingdom.

Footnotes

External links
  Jozef Mihál's official website

Government ministers of Slovakia
Members of the National Council (Slovakia) 2016-2020
Freedom and Solidarity politicians
Charles University alumni
Comenius University alumni
1965 births
Living people
Politicians from Bratislava